Electronomicon is an album released in 2000 by New Zealand electronica duo Pitch Black. Electronomicon was later re-released in a special version which included the original recordings remastered, and a second disc of remixes.

Track listing

Disc 1
"Reptile Room"
"Electric Earth Part 1"
"Electric Earth Part 2"
"Data Diviner"
"Urbanoia"
"The 48 Skanks"
"Unadrumma"

Disc 2
"Electric Earth [DC Mix]"
"Reptile Room [Ekto Remix]"
"Electric Earth [Youth Remix]"
"Urbanoia [Vinyl Edit]"
"Electric Earth [Pylonz Remix]"
"The 48 Skanks [Rockwood Remix]"
"Unadrumma [Sunshine Sound System Remix]"
"Electric Earth [Rotort Remix]"
"The 48 Skanks [Rockwood Chill Remix]"

References

Pitch Black (band) albums
2000 albums